Bezonvaux is a commune in the Meuse department in the Grand Est region in northeastern France.

History
Since the end of the Battle of Verdun in 1916, it has been unoccupied (official population: 0) along with Beaumont-en-Verdunois, Haumont-près-Samogneux, Louvemont-Côte-du-Poivre, Cumières-le-Mort-Homme and Fleury-devant-Douaumont.

During the war, the town was destroyed and the land was made uninhabitable to such an extent that a decision was made not to rebuild it. The site of the commune is maintained as a testimony to war and is officially designated as a "village that died for France". It is managed by a municipal council of three members appointed by the prefect of the Meuse department.

See also
 Zone rouge (First World War)
 List of French villages destroyed in World War I
 Communes of the Meuse department

References

Communes of Meuse (department)
Destroyed towns
Former populated places in France